or  is Norway’s 11th largest lake. The  lake lies in the Bardu Municipality in Troms og Finnmark county, Norway. The lake is the largest lake in the county. The lake is regulated by a dam on the northwestern end of the lake.

The water discharges to the north into the Barduelva river, which empties into Målselva river, which in turn empties into the Malangen fjord.

References

Lakes of Troms og Finnmark
Bardu
Reservoirs in Norway